The 1952 Michigan State Normal Hurons football team represented Michigan State Normal College (renamed Eastern Michigan College in 1956 and Eastern Michigan University in 1959) in the Interstate Intercollegiate Athletic Conference (IIAC) during the 1952 college football season. In their first season under head coach Fred Trosko, the Hurons compiled a 5–3–1 record (3–2–1 against IIAC opponents), finished in third place in the IIAC, and outscored their opponents, 154 to 146. The team was rated as the best team fielded by the school since 1945.

Lineman Christopher J. Armelagos was the team captain. He was also voted as the team's most valuable player. The team's statistical leaders included Bob Middlekauff with 540 yards of total offense, Ed Skowneski with 328 rushing yards, and Dick Moseley with seven touchdowns and 42 points. Chris Armelagos received the team's most valuable player award.

Trosko was hired as the school's head coach in July 1952. In 1951, he had coached Owosso High School to an undefeated and was named Michigan's high school coach of the year by the Detroit Free Press.  He had previously played at the halfback position for the University of Michigan football team from 1937 to 1939. Trosko remained as the head football coach at Michigan State Normal/Eastern Michigan for 13 years through the 1964 season.

Schedule

References

Michigan State Normal
Eastern Michigan Eagles football seasons
Michigan State Normal Hurons football